Last of the Ghetto Astronauts is the debut album of the Matthew Good Band. It was released independently in 1995 on a budget of roughly $5,000 CAD. With the singles "Alabama Motel Room" and "Symbolistic White Walls", the album achieved popularity, particularly in western Canada. The album was certified Gold in Canada on January 30, 2003.

The band was originally going to go with another name ("Snowaxe" and "Gandalf" have been mentioned by Matthew Good); however a radio station in Vancouver played "Alabama Motel Room" and announced the band as the Matthew Good Band, at which point it stuck.

Album covers
Last of the Ghetto Astronauts has two album covers: the original, independent cover, with cursive writing along the bottom and the band name featured prominently, and the subsequent production company release, which uses block letters and a different text layout. Both albums have the same pictures.

Track listing
All tracks written by Matthew Good, except where noted.

Miscellanea
 The album's title comes from a six-minute song of the same name on Good's 1994 demo 15 Hours on a September Thursday.
 Two of the songs on Last of the Ghetto Astronauts were re-released on the EP Raygun (1996). Whereas the recording of "Alabama Motel Room" on Raygun is identical to that which appears on Last of the Ghetto Astronauts, the Raygun version of "Haven't Slept in Years" is completely redone (to the satisfaction of many fans).
 Not a single electric guitar was employed in the recording of this album. All guitars heard on the album were either acoustics or acoustics run through Marshall amplifiers.
 Two songs were cut from the album. One was "Sharks of Downtown", a song which the band performed at Much Music Headquarters in June, 1996. The other was called "Revenge". A video was posted on Geoff Lloyd's Facebook memorial page in 2010, showing the band working on the song during the recording of the album. Charlie Quintana helped record drums along with Ian Browne for it. The video was taken down and is no longer available.

Personnel
Matthew Good Band
Matthew Good                             - vocals, guitar
Ian Browne         - drums
Geoff Lloyd                                  - bass guitar
Dave Genn                                 - organ, Rhodes piano
Steve Black                                   - Piano on track 9
Judy Renouf                                   - Cello on track 9
John Shepp                                    - Producer, mixer, percussion on track 4
Note: Terry Brown mixed tracks 1 & 2
George Leger                                  - Mastering
George Jenkins                                - Layout & Design
Recorded at Utopia Parkway Studios, Vancouver, British Columbia, Canada
Manufacturer: Darktown Records
Distributor: A&M Records, a division of PolyGram Inc.
Words and music by Matthew Good
Except "Alabama Motel Room", music by Good/Lloyd/Browne

References

1995 debut albums
Matthew Good albums
A&M Records albums